Annular velocity is the speed of the drilling fluid's movement in a column called an annulus in oil wells. It is commonly measured in feet per minute (ft/min) or meters per minute (m/min). Annular velocity is often abbreviated as AV, though this is not exclusively so, as AV also refers to apparent viscosity which is calculated from rheometer readings from tests that the mud engineer performs.

Scope

For this article, annular velocity is described, as used in drilling fluid applications in the oil exploration industry. There may be other applications in other fields of study such as fluid mechanics (the study of the movement of fluid) or fluid dynamics (the study of the flow of fluid).

Determination

The annular velocity can be calculated using one of the following formulas.

Or

Where:
AV = annular velocity in Ft/min (feet per minute)
PObpm = pump output in bpm (barrels per minute) 1 barrel = 42 gallons
POgpm = pump output in gpm (gallons per minute) 1 gallon = 0.0238095238 barrels
ID2 = inside diameter of the wellbore or casing, squared
OD2 = outside diameter of the drill pipe or tubing, squared
1029.4 = A conversion factor constant used to calculate the volume between the outside of a tube within  the inside of another tube, using barrels.
24.5 = A conversion factor constant used to calculate the volume between the outside of a tube within  the inside of another tube, using gallons.
Pump Output = Refers to the measurement of the quantity of a fluid (to put that fluid in motion).

Application

The annular velocity is one of two major variables in the process of cleaning
solids (drill cuttings) from the wellbore. By maintaining the annular velocity at certain rates (speeds) in conjunction with the rheological properties of the drilling fluid, the wellbore is kept clean of the drill cuttings to prevent them  from settling back down to the bottom and causing drilling problems.

The other major variable is the rheology of the drilling fluid. Rheology is sometimes thought of as viscosity to the uninitiated, though improperly. Viscosity (sometimes thought of as its thickness) is a very basic measurement of the fluids resistance to change in movement or flow. The viscosity of a fluid can be measured with a Marsh Funnel. Rheology is the study of viscosity and requires more precise and complicated procedures and equipment for its determination. For drilling fluid applications a rheometer is used.

See also

Petroleum Engineering
Drilling rig
Oilfield
Oil well
List of acronyms in oil and gas exploration and production
List of oilfield service companies
List of oil fields
Natural gas field

References

Fluid dynamics
Drilling fluid